Thomas Edward Hibberd (April 22, 1926 – May 10, 2017) was a Canadian ice hockey player. He was a member of the Ottawa RCAF Flyers who won the gold medal in ice hockey for Canada at the 1948 Winter Olympics in St. Moritz. In 2001 Hibberd was honoured by the Canadian Forces when it was announced that the 1948 RCAF Flyers were selected as Canada's greatest military athletes of the 20th century. He died on May 10, 2017 at the age of 91.

References

1926 births
2017 deaths
Canadian ice hockey forwards
Ice hockey players at the 1948 Winter Olympics
Medalists at the 1948 Winter Olympics
Olympic gold medalists for Canada
Olympic ice hockey players of Canada
Olympic medalists in ice hockey